Peter Nero (born Bernard Nierow, May 22, 1934) is an American pianist and pops conductor. He directed the Philly Pops from 1979 to 2013, and has earned two Grammy Awards.

Early life
Born in Brooklyn, New York, as Bernard Nierow, he started his formal music training at the age of seven. He studied piano under Frederick Bried. By the time he was 14, he was accepted to New York City's High School of Music & Art and won a scholarship to the Juilliard School of Music. Constance Keene, his teacher and mentor, once wrote in an issue of Keyboard Classics "Vladimir Horowitz was Peter's greatest fan!" He graduated from Brooklyn College in 1956.

Career
Nero recorded his first album under the name of Bernie Nerow in July 1957 under the Mode label MOD-LP117 which shows his technical virtuosity in the jazz genre. Nero recorded an album in 1961, and won a Grammy Award that year for Best New Artist. Since then, he has received another Grammy, garnered 10 additional nominations and released 67 albums. Nero's early association with RCA Victor produced 23 albums in eight years. His subsequent move to Columbia Records resulted in the million-selling single and album Summer of '42.

His first major national TV success came at the age of 17 when he was chosen to perform Gershwin's Rhapsody in Blue on Paul Whiteman's TV special. He subsequently appeared on many top variety and talk shows, including 11 guest appearances on The Ed Sullivan Show and numerous appearances on The Tonight Show Starring Johnny Carson.

Hailed as one of the premier interpreters of Gershwin, Nero starred in the Emmy Award-winning S'Wonderful, S'Marvelous, S'Gershwin (1972). Other TV credits include performances on PBS-TV's Piano Pizzazz and with the National Symphony in Washington, D.C., on its July 4 special titled A Capitol Fourth. Nero served as music director and pianist for the PBS-TV special The Songs of Johnny Mercer: Too Marvelous for Words (1997) with co-stars Johnny Mathis, Melissa Manchester and many members of The POPS.

In 1963, Nero composed and performed the musical score for the motion picture Sunday in New York. The title song has been recorded by over two dozen vocalists, and the score was nominated for both a Golden Globe and Hollywood Reporter Award. He also made an appearance in the film with Jane Fonda, Rod Taylor, and Cliff Robertson. In the film, Jane Fonda's character gave her brother (Robertson) a Nero recording.

Nero has worked with notable musicians including Frank Sinatra, Mel Torme,  Arthur Fiedler, Andy Williams, Ray Charles, Dizzy Gillespie, Diane Schuur, Johnny Mathis, Roger Kellaway and Elton John.

Nero was the founding music director of Peter Nero and the Philly Pops, which he led from 1979 to 2013.

From 1990 to 1999, Nero was also Pops Music Director of the Florida Philharmonic Orchestra, conducting and performing with his jazz trio throughout Southeastern Florida. 

Nero's recordings include albums with symphony orchestras: On My Own, Classical Connections and My Way. He recorded Peter Nero and Friends where he collaborated with Mel Torme, Maureen McGovern, Doc Severinsen and others. Nero's latest albums Love Songs for a Rainy Day and More in Love focus on romantic themes. By popular demand, four of his earlier recordings have been reissued. He most recently appeared on Rod Stewart's album As Time Goes By: The Great American Songbook, Volume II.  He has released over 60 albums in his career.

Awards and honors
In an interview with Keyboard Magazine, Ray Charles was asked who his favorite pianist was. "Art Tatum could play anything he wanted to," Charles replied, "...and Peter Nero [also] plays his buns off!"

In addition to the two Grammy Awards, Nero's honors include six honorary doctorates, the most recent from Drexel University in 2004, and the International Society of Performing Arts Presenters Award for Excellence in the Arts. He is also included on historic Walks of Fame in Philadelphia and Miami, Florida. In 1999, he received the Pennsylvania Distinguished Arts Award from Pennsylvania Governor Tom Ridge; previous honorees include Marian Anderson, James Michener, Andrew Wyeth and Riccardo Muti. In 2009, Nero was awarded the Lifetime Achievement Award from the American Federation of Musicians.

Personal life
Nero is active in many charitable causes, including the funding of school music programs, fundraising for the building of new arts centers across the country, and research on cancer, dystonia and autism.

Nero favors Steinway concert grand pianos.

He is the father of two children, Beverly and Jedd, and has three grandchildren; Robert, Nicole and Gordon.

References

External links

 PeterNero.com
 Philly Pops

Grammy Award winners
1934 births
Living people
Musicians from Brooklyn
Easy listening musicians
RCA Victor artists
Brooklyn College alumni
Juilliard School alumni
The High School of Music & Art alumni
20th-century American pianists
American male pianists
21st-century American pianists
20th-century American male musicians
21st-century American male musicians
Columbia Records artists